Mohammadabad-e Ab Shirin (also Romanized as Moḩammadābād-e Āb Shīrīn, Moḩammadābād Āb-e Shirin, Mohammad Abad Ab Shirin, and Moḩammadābād-e Āb-e Shirin; also known as Moḩammadābād) is a village in Azizabad Rural District, in the Central District of Narmashir County, Kerman Province, Iran. At the 2006 census, its population was 1,101, in 212 families.

References 

Populated places in Narmashir County